Proposition 11 of 2008 (or the Voters FIRST Act) was a law enacted by California voters that placed the power to draw electoral boundaries for State Assembly and State Senate districts in a Citizens Redistricting Commission, as opposed to the State Legislature. To do this the Act amended both the Constitution of California and the Government Code. The law was proposed by means of the initiative process and was put to voters as part of the November 4, 2008 state elections. In 2010, voters passed Proposition 20 which extended the Citizen Redistricting Commission's power to draw electoral boundaries to include U.S. House seats as well.

Provisions

The Act amended Article XXI of the state constitution and enacted Title 2, Division 1, Chapter 3.2 of the Government Code. These changes transfer authority for establishing Assembly, Senate, and Board of Equalization district boundaries from elected representatives to a fourteen-member commission. The commission is chosen as follows:

Government auditors select sixty registered voters from an applicant pool.
Legislative leaders are permitted to reduce the pool.
Auditors then pick eight commission members by lottery, and those commissioners pick six additional members for a total of fourteen.

The commission must include five commissioners of the largest political party in California (in practice the Democrats), five commissioners from the second largest party (currently the Republicans), and four of neither party. For approval, new district boundaries need votes from three commissioners of the largest party, three from the second largest, and three of the commissioners from neither party. The commission may hire lawyers and consultants to assist it in its work.

The state legislature retains responsibility for drawing district boundaries for California's Congressional Districts, but the Act adds additional criteria that the legislature must follow in drawing those boundaries.

Supporters

California Common Cause was the advocacy group sponsoring the initiative.

Others supporting the initiative include 

 AARP
 NAACP California State Conference
 The Los Angeles Chamber of Commerce
 The League of Women Voters
 Gov. Arnold Schwarzenegger (Republican)
 Former Governor Gray Davis (Democrat)
 Former State Controller Steve Westly
 California Chamber of Commerce
 California Common Cause
 California Forward Action Fund
 California Business Roundtable
 ACLU - Southern California
 Bay Area Council
 Bay Area Leadership Council
 California Black Chamber of Commerce
 California Police Chiefs Association
 League of California Cities
 California Democratic Council
 California Republican Assembly
 California Small Business Association
 California Taxpayers' Association
 California Conference of Carpenters
 Central California Hispanic Chamber of Commerce
 IndependentVoice.Org
 National Federation of Independent Business, California
 North San Diego County NAACP
 Neighborhoods for Clean Elections
 Santa Clara Cities Association
 Silicon Valley Leadership Group
 Small Business Action Committee
 California Association of Health Underwriters

Newspaper Editorial boards in favor

 The Los Angeles Times
The San Francisco Chronicle
 San Jose Mercury News
 Fresno Bee
 The Torrance Daily Breeze
 San Diego Union Tribune
 Pasadena Now
 LA Daily News
 North County Times
 Stockton Record
 San Gabriel Valley Tribune
 Santa Cruz Sentinel
 Lompoc Record

Arguments in favor of Prop. 11

Notable arguments that have been made in favor of Prop. 11 include:

 Under current law the legislature draws its own districts which results in 99 percent of incumbents being re-elected
 Partisan gridlock caused by the current way of drawing legislative districts has caused the legislature to underperform in its mission of serving the people of California.,
 State legislative contests held in districts drawn by a Proposition 11 commission would be more competitive, leading to voters electing more moderate legislators.

Donors supporting Prop 11

As of September 24, three campaign committees supporting Prop. 11 have filed officially with the Secretary of State's office. Some donors have contributed to more than one of these committees. The largest donors altogether are:

 Gov. Schwarzenegger's California Dream Team, $2,446,000.
 Charles Munger Jr., son of billionaire Charles Munger, $1 million
 Michael Bloomberg (the mayor of New York City), $250,000.
 Howard Lester (of Williams-Sonoma), $250,000.
 Brian Harvey, president of Cypress Land Company, $250,000.
 Reed Hastings, founder of Netflix, $250,000 
 New Majority California PAC, $237,500.
 Meg Whitman, CEO, eBay, $200,000.
 William Bloomfield, $150,000

City of Pasadena endorses

On Monday, March 10, 2008 the Pasadena City Council became the first California city to endorse the proposition.

Path to the ballot

Kimball Petition Management was paid $2,332,988 from two separate campaign committees to collect signatures to put this measure on the ballot. Signatures to qualify the measure for the California 2008 ballot measures|November 2008 ballot were submitted to election officials on May 6, 2008.  On June 17, the California Secretary of State announced that a check of the signatures had established that the measure qualifies for the ballot.,

Supporters file campaign financing complaint

In late August, supporters of Prop. 11 filed a complaint with the Fair Political Practices Commission because the California Correctional Peace Officers Association—a group that opposes Prop. 11—gave contributions totaling $577,000 to the Leadership California committee, which is a campaign committee associated with state senate leader Don Perata. The Prop. 11 group said that it was wrong for the police officers union to give the money to the Perata committee rather than directly to the No on 11, and also alleged that the police union was trying to curry favor with Perata. Days later, the FPPC took the rare step of rejecting the complaint without conducting an investigation.

Opposition

The official committee set up to oppose Proposition 11 was called "Citizens for Accountability; No on Proposition 11". Paul Hefner is the spokesman for the "No on 11" effort.

Opponents to Prop. 11 include 
 U.S. Senator Barbara Boxer
 House Speaker Nancy Pelosi
 the California Democratic Party
 the Mexican American Legal Defense and Education Fund
 the NAACP Defense Fund
 the Asian-American Pacific Legal Center

Arguments against Prop. 11

Arguments that have been claimed in opposition to Prop. 11 include:

 No accountability to taxpayers.  Each commission member is guaranteed $300 a day, plus unlimited expenses in the form of staffing, offices, etc.
 The commission created under Prop. 11 would allow politicians to hide behind the selected bureaucrats to maintain a hold on redistricting as they wish.
 The overly complicated process created by Prop. 11 would make it easier to mask hidden agendas of the people behind those on the committee.
 Prop. 11 offers no assurance of the same representation for communities, such as California's Hispanic community in the redistricting process.
 The current version of Prop. 11 does not include congressional districts as an earlier draft did, thereby not being complete reform and creating additional detractors to the measure.
 Even when commissions do create competitive districts, the people who get elected in them do not necessarily behave as political moderates.

Democrat against Democrat

Kathay Feng, the main author of the initiative, and director of California Common Cause, said in late June that since the measure qualified for the ballot and the California Democratic Party had announced its opposition, there had been an attempt to bring everybody into line and to encourage those in support of the measure to oppose it.

Donations to opposition campaign

As of September 24, the opposition committee, "Citizens for Accountability; No on 11", had raised $350,000:

 California Democratic Party, $75,000.
 California Correctional Peace Officers Association, Truth in American Government Fund, $250,000.
 Members' Voice of the State Building Trades, $25,000.
 "Voter's First" campaign committee, $40,000

Polling information

A poll released on July 22, 2008 by Field Poll showed Proposition 11 with 42% support and 30% opposition. A late August poll released by the Public Policy Institute of California showed Prop. 11 with 39% of voters in support.

Result of vote

References

Further reading
 Capital Weekly, California forward launches reform effort, March 27, 2008
 California redistricting plan faces hurdles
 Politicians will lie to kill Proposition 11, July 2, 2008
 California Redistricting, Courtesy Of Lindsay Lohan?
 Prop 11 will take politics out of re-districting
 Ballot will hold treatment for budget stalemate
 Editorial: Prop. 11 looking good
 Anti-11 group calls measure too complicated ahead of pro-11 rally
 2009 will be year of government reform measures

External links
Full text of Proposition 11
Yes on Prop 11, official website supporting Proposition 11
No on Prop 11, official website opposing Proposition 11
 California Voter's Guide to Proposition 11
California Common Cause website
Ballot Summary
Financial details of support committee
League of Women Votes, Time line of the initiative
 CaliforniaPropositions.org Prop 11 information page

11
2008
Initiatives in the United States
Electoral reform referendums